The electrical resistance of an object is a measure of its opposition to the flow of electric current. Electrical resistance shares some conceptual parallels with mechanical friction. The SI unit of electrical resistance is the ohm, while electrical conductance is measured in siemens (S) (formerly called the 'mho' and then represented by ).

The resistance of an object depends in large part on the material it is made of. Objects made of electrical insulators like rubber tend to have very high resistance and low conductance, while objects made of electrical conductors like metals tend to have very low resistance and high conductance. This relationship is quantified by resistivity or conductivity. The nature of a material is not the only factor in resistance and conductance, however; it also depends on the size and shape of an object because these properties are extensive rather than intensive. For example, a wire's resistance is higher if it is long and thin, and lower if it is short and thick. All objects resist electrical current, except for superconductors, which have a resistance of zero.

This proportionality is called Ohm's law, and materials that satisfy it are called ohmic materials.

The ratio  is sometimes still useful, and is referred to as a chordal resistance or static resistance, since it corresponds to the inverse slope of a chord between the origin and an – curve. In other situations, the derivative  may be most useful; this is called the differential resistance.

Introduction

In the hydraulic analogy, current flowing through a wire (or resistor) is like water flowing through a pipe, and the voltage drop across the wire is like the pressure drop that pushes water through the pipe. Conductance is proportional to how much flow occurs for a given pressure, and resistance is proportional to how much pressure is required to achieve a given flow. 

The voltage drop (i.e., difference between voltages on one side of the resistor and the other), not the voltage itself, provides the driving force pushing current through a resistor. In hydraulics, it is similar: the pressure difference between two sides of a pipe, not the pressure itself, determines the flow through it. For example, there may be a large water pressure above the pipe, which tries to push water down through the pipe. But there may be an equally large water pressure below the pipe, which tries to push water back up through the pipe. If these pressures are equal, no water flows. (In the image at right, the water pressure below the pipe is zero.)

The resistance and conductance of a wire, resistor, or other element is mostly determined by two properties:
 geometry (shape), and
 material

Geometry is important because it is more difficult to push water through a long, narrow pipe than a wide, short pipe. In the same way, a long, thin copper wire has higher resistance (lower conductance) than a short, thick copper wire.

Materials are important as well. A pipe filled with hair restricts the flow of water more than a clean pipe of the same shape and size. Similarly, electrons can flow freely and easily through a copper wire, but cannot flow as easily through a steel wire of the same shape and size, and they essentially cannot flow at all through an insulator like rubber, regardless of its shape. The difference between copper, steel, and rubber is related to their microscopic structure and electron configuration, and is quantified by a property called resistivity.

In addition to geometry and material, there are various other factors that influence resistance and conductance, such as temperature; see below.

Conductors and resistors

Substances in which electricity can flow are called conductors. A piece of conducting material of a particular resistance meant for use in a circuit is called a resistor. Conductors are made of high-conductivity materials such as metals, in particular copper and aluminium. Resistors, on the other hand, are made of a wide variety of materials depending on factors such as the desired resistance, amount of energy that it needs to dissipate, precision, and costs.

Ohm's law

For many materials, the current  through the material is proportional to the voltage  applied across it:

over a wide range of voltages and currents.  Therefore, the resistance and conductance of objects or electronic components made of these materials is constant. This relationship is called Ohm's law, and materials which obey it are called ohmic materials.  Examples of ohmic components are wires and resistors. The current–voltage graph of an ohmic device consists of a straight line through the origin with positive slope.

Other components and materials used in electronics do not obey Ohm's law; the current is not proportional to the voltage, so the resistance varies with the voltage and current through them.  These are called nonlinear or non-ohmic. Examples include diodes and fluorescent lamps.  The current-voltage curve of a nonohmic device is a curved line.

Relation to resistivity and conductivity 

The resistance of a given object depends primarily on two factors: what material it is made of, and its shape. For a given material, the resistance is inversely proportional to the cross-sectional area; for example, a thick copper wire has lower resistance than an otherwise-identical thin copper wire. Also, for a given material, the resistance is proportional to the length; for example, a long copper wire has higher resistance than an otherwise-identical short copper wire. The resistance  and conductance  of a conductor of uniform cross section, therefore, can be computed as

The resistivity and conductivity are proportionality constants, and therefore depend only on the material the wire is made of, not the geometry of the wire. Resistivity and conductivity are reciprocals: . Resistivity is a measure of the material's ability to oppose electric current.

This formula is not exact, as it assumes the current density is totally uniform in the conductor, which is not always true in practical situations. However, this formula still provides a good approximation for long thin conductors such as wires.

Another situation for which this formula is not exact is with alternating current (AC), because the skin effect inhibits current flow near the center of the conductor. For this reason, the geometrical cross-section is different from the effective cross-section in which current actually flows, so resistance is higher than expected. Similarly, if two conductors near each other carry AC current, their resistances increase due to the proximity effect. At commercial power frequency, these effects are significant for large conductors carrying large currents, such as busbars in an electrical substation, or large power cables carrying more than a few hundred amperes.

The resistivity of different materials varies by an enormous amount: For example, the conductivity of teflon is about 1030 times lower than the conductivity of copper. Loosely speaking, this is because metals have large numbers of "delocalized" electrons that are not stuck in any one place, so they are free to move across large distances. In an insulator, such as Teflon, each electron is tightly bound to a single molecule so a great force is required to pull it away. Semiconductors lie between these two extremes. More details can be found in the article: Electrical resistivity and conductivity. For the case of electrolyte solutions, see the article: Conductivity (electrolytic).

Resistivity varies with temperature. In semiconductors, resistivity also changes when exposed to light. See below.

Measurement

An instrument for measuring resistance is called an ohmmeter.  Simple ohmmeters cannot measure low resistances accurately because the resistance of their measuring leads causes a voltage drop that interferes with the measurement, so more accurate devices use four-terminal sensing.

Typical values

Static and differential resistance

Many electrical elements, such as diodes and batteries do  satisfy Ohm's law. These are called non-ohmic or non-linear, and their current–voltage curves are  straight lines through the origin.

Resistance and conductance can still be defined for non-ohmic elements. However, unlike ohmic resistance, non-linear resistance is not constant but varies with the voltage or current through the device; i.e., its operating point. There are two types of resistance:

AC circuits

Impedance and admittance

When an alternating current flows through a circuit, the relation between current and voltage across a circuit element is characterized not only by the ratio of their magnitudes, but also the difference in their phases. For example, in an ideal resistor, the moment when the voltage reaches its maximum, the current also reaches its maximum (current and voltage are oscillating in phase). But for a capacitor or inductor, the maximum current flow occurs as the voltage passes through zero and vice versa (current and voltage are oscillating 90° out of phase, see image below). Complex numbers are used to keep track of both the phase and magnitude of current and voltage:

where:
  is time;
  and  indicate the amplitude of the voltage and current, respectively;
  is the angular frequency of the AC current;
  is the displacement angle;
  indicates the real part of a complex number; and
  is the imaginary unit.

The impedance and admittance may be expressed as complex numbers that can be broken into real and imaginary parts:

These lead to the complex number identities

which are true in all cases, whereas  is only true in the special cases of either DC or reactance-free current.

The complex angle  is the phase difference between the voltage and current passing through a component with impedance . In general, AC systems are designed to keep the phase angle close to 0° as much as possible, since it reduces the reactive power, which does no useful work at a load. In a simple case with an inductive load (causing the phase to increase), a capacitor may be added for compensation at one frequency, since the capacitor's phase shift is negative, bringing the total impedance phase closer to 0° again.

Frequency dependence 
A key feature of AC circuits is that the resistance and conductance can be frequency-dependent, a phenomenon known as the universal dielectric response. One reason, mentioned above is the skin effect (and the related proximity effect). Another reason is that the resistivity itself may depend on frequency (see Drude model, deep-level traps, resonant frequency, Kramers–Kronig relations, etc.)

Energy dissipation and Joule heating

Resistors (and other elements with resistance) oppose the flow of electric current; therefore, electrical energy is required to push current through the resistance. This electrical energy is dissipated, heating the resistor in the process. This is called Joule heating (after James Prescott Joule), also called ohmic heating or resistive heating.

The dissipation of electrical energy is often undesired, particularly in the case of transmission losses in power lines. High voltage transmission helps reduce the losses by reducing the current for a given power.

On the other hand, Joule heating is sometimes useful, for example in electric stoves and other electric heaters (also called resistive heaters). As another example, incandescent lamps rely on Joule heating: the filament is heated to such a high temperature that it glows "white hot" with thermal radiation (also called incandescence).

The formula for Joule heating is:

Dependence on other conditions

Temperature dependence 

Near room temperature, the resistivity of metals typically increases as temperature is increased, while the resistivity of semiconductors typically decreases as temperature is increased. The resistivity of insulators and electrolytes may increase or decrease depending on the system. For the detailed behavior and explanation, see Electrical resistivity and conductivity.

As a consequence, the resistance of wires, resistors, and other components often change with temperature. This effect may be undesired, causing an electronic circuit to malfunction at extreme temperatures. In some cases, however, the effect is put to good use. When temperature-dependent resistance of a component is used purposefully, the component is called a resistance thermometer or thermistor. (A resistance thermometer is made of metal, usually platinum, while a thermistor is made of ceramic or polymer.)

Resistance thermometers and thermistors are generally used in two ways. First, they can be used as thermometers: by measuring the resistance, the temperature of the environment can be inferred. Second, they can be used in conjunction with Joule heating (also called self-heating): if a large current is running through the resistor, the resistor's temperature rises and therefore its resistance changes. Therefore, these components can be used in a circuit-protection role similar to fuses, or for feedback in circuits, or for many other purposes. In general, self-heating can turn a resistor into a nonlinear and hysteretic circuit element. For more details see Thermistor#Self-heating effects.

If the temperature  does not vary too much, a linear approximation is typically used:

The parameter  is an empirical parameter fitted from measurement data. Because the linear approximation is only an approximation,  is different for different reference temperatures.

It is usually negative for semiconductors and insulators, with highly variable magnitude.

Strain dependence 

Just as the resistance of a conductor depends upon temperature, the resistance of a conductor depends upon strain. By placing a conductor under tension (a form of stress that leads to strain in the form of stretching of the conductor), the length of the section of conductor under tension increases and its cross-sectional area decreases. Both these effects contribute to increasing the resistance of the strained section of conductor. Under compression (strain in the opposite direction), the resistance of the strained section of conductor decreases. See the discussion on strain gauges for details about devices constructed to take advantage of this effect.

Light illumination dependence 

Some resistors, particularly those made from semiconductors, exhibit photoconductivity, meaning that their resistance changes when light is shining on them. Therefore, they are called photoresistors (or light dependent resistors). These are a common type of light detector.

Superconductivity

This also means there is no joule heating, or in other words no dissipation of electrical energy. Therefore, if superconductive wire is made into a closed loop, current flows around the loop forever. Superconductors require cooling to temperatures near  with liquid helium for most metallic superconductors like niobium–tin alloys, or cooling to temperatures near  with liquid nitrogen for the expensive, brittle and delicate ceramic high temperature superconductors.
Nevertheless, there are many technological applications of superconductivity, including superconducting magnets.

See also

 Conductance quantum
 Von Klitzing constant (its reciprocal)
 Electrical measurements
 Contact resistance
 Electrical resistivity and conductivity for more information about the physical mechanisms for conduction in materials.
 Johnson–Nyquist noise
 Quantum Hall effect, a standard for high-accuracy resistance measurements.
 Resistor
 RKM code
 Series and parallel circuits
 Sheet resistance
 SI electromagnetism units
 Thermal resistance
 Voltage divider
 Voltage drop

Footnotes

References

External links

 
Electricity
Physical quantities
Electromagnetism